The United States Virgin Islands competed at the 2014 Summer Youth Olympics held in Nanjing, China from 16 August to 28 August 2014.

Athletics

Virgin Islands qualified one athlete.

Qualification Legend: Q=Final A (medal); qB=Final B (non-medal); qC=Final C (non-medal); qD=Final D (non-medal); qE=Final E (non-medal)

Boys
Track & road events

Beach Volleyball

Virgin Islands was given a team to compete from the tripartite committee.

Sailing

Virgin Islands qualified two boats based on its performance at the Byte CII North American & Caribbean Continental Qualifiers.

References

2014 in United States Virgin Islands sports
Nations at the 2014 Summer Youth Olympics
Virgin Islands at the Youth Olympics